Sheilagh Catheren Ogilvie, FBA (born 7 October 1958) is a Canadian historian, economist, and academic, specialising in economic history. Since 2020, she has been Chichele Professor of Economic History at the University of Oxford. Previously, she taught at the University of Cambridge.

Early life and education
Ogilvie was born on 7 October 1958 to Robert Townley Ogilvie and Sheilagh Stuart Ogilvie. She was brought up in Calgary, Alberta, Canada. She was educated at Grantown Grammar School, a state school in Grantown-on-Spey, Scotland, and at Queen Elizabeth High School in Calgary, Alberta. She studied modern history and English at the University of St Andrews, graduating with a first class undergraduate Master of Arts (MA Hons) degree in 1979. She undertook postgraduate research in history at Trinity College, Cambridge, and completed her Doctor of Philosophy (PhD) degree in 1985. Her doctoral thesis was titled "Corporatism and regulation in rural industry: woollen weaving in Wurttemberg, 1590-1740". She later studied for a Master of Arts (MA) degree in social sciences (economics) at the University of Chicago, which she completed in 1992.

Academic career
From 1984 to 1988, Ogilvie was a research fellow at Trinity College, Cambridge. In 1989, she joined the Faculty of Economics of the University of Cambridge as an assistant lecturer in economic history. She was promoted to lecturer in 1992, and made a Reader in Economic History in 1999. In 2004, she was appointed Professor of Economic History. Between 2013 and 2016, she additionally held a Wolfson/British Academy Research Professorship. 

In April 2020, it was announced that she would be the next Chichele Professor of Economic History at the University of Oxford. She took up the professorship for the start of the 2020/21 academic year and was additionally elected a Fellow of All Souls College, Oxford. She is additionally an associate member of the Department of Economics, University of Oxford.

Ogilvie has held a number of visiting appointments. From 1993 to 1994, she was a visiting fellow at the Czech National Archive in Prague, and a guest dozent in the Department of Economic and Social History at the University of Vienna. From 1994 to 1995, she was a visiting fellow at the Centre for History and Economics of King's College, Cambridge. In 1998, she was a visiting fellow at the Center for Economic Studies of the Ludwig Maximilian University of Munich.

Honours
In 2004, Ogilvie was elected a Fellow of the British Academy (FBA), the United Kingdom's national academy for the humanities and social sciences. In 2021, she was elected a Fellow of the Academy of Social Sciences (FACSS).

Selected publications
 Edwards, Jeremy, and Sheilagh Ogilvie. "Contract enforcement, institutions, and social capital: the Maghribi traders reappraised1." The Economic History Review 65.2 (2012): 421-444.
 Ogilvie, Sheilagh. Institutions and European trade: Merchant guilds, 1000–1800. Cambridge University Press, 2011.
 Ogilvie, Sheilagh. "Rehabilitating the guilds: a reply." The Economic History Review 61.1 (2008): 175-182.
 Ogilvie, Sheilagh. "'Whatever is, is right'? Economic institutions in pre‐industrial Europe1." The Economic History Review 60.4 (2007): 649-684.
 Ogilvie, Sheilagh. "How does social capital affect women? Guilds and communities in early modern Germany." The American historical review 109.2 (2004): 325-359.
 Ogilvie, Sheilagh. "Guilds, efficiency, and social capital: evidence from German proto-industry." Economic history review (2004): 286-333.
 Ogilvie, Sheilagh C. A bitter living: women, markets, and social capital in early modern Germany. Oxford University Press on Demand, 2003.
 Ogilvie, Sheilagh, and Markus Cerman. European proto-industrialization: an introductory handbook. Cambridge University Press, 1996.
 Edwards, Jeremy, and Sheilagh Ogilvie. "Universal banks and German industrialization: a reappraisal1." The Economic History Review 49.3 (1996): 427-446.
 Ogilvie, Sheilagh. European Guilds: An Economic Analysis. Princeton University Press, 2021.

References

1958 births
Living people
Canadian women historians
Canadian economists
20th-century Canadian historians
21st-century Canadian historians
Canadian women economists
Economic historians
Academics of the University of Cambridge
Fellows of the British Academy
Writers from Calgary
Alumni of the University of St Andrews
Alumni of Trinity College, Cambridge
University of Chicago alumni
21st-century Canadian women writers
20th-century Canadian women writers
Chichele Professors of Economic History
Fellows of the Academy of Social Sciences